Harry d'Abbadie d'Arrast (6 May 1897 – 17 March 1968) was an Argentinean born, French screenwriter and director.

Life 
d'Abbadie d'Arrast was born in Argentina in 1893 to a family of French aristocratic origins. He moved to the United States in 1922 and settled in Hollywood. He worked as a technical advisor to Charlie Chaplin and had made his first film by 1927.

He was nominated at the 4th Academy Awards for the now defunct category of Best Story for the film Laughter. His nomination was shared with Donald Ogden Stewart and Douglas Z. Doty.

He also was in the French army during World War I. d'Abbadie d'Arrast married retired silent-film actress Eleanor Boardman (1898–1991) in 1940, and remained married until his death in 1968.

Filmography

As a Director

 The Gold Rush (1925) (assistant director, uncredited)
 A Gentleman of Paris (1927)
 Serenade (1927)
 Service for Ladies (1927)
 Wings (1927) (uncredited)
 Dry Martini (1928)
 The Magnificent Flirt (1928)
 Laughter (1930)
 Raffles (1930) (uncredited-was the director then fired)
 Topaze (1933)
 It Happened in Spain (1934)
 The Three Cornered Hat (1935)

As a Writer

 The Magnificent Flirt (1928)
 Laughter (1930)
 Die Männer um Lucie (1931)
 Lo mejor es reir (1931)
 Rive gauche (1931)
 It Happened in Spain (1934)

References

External links

1890s births
1968 deaths
Writers from Buenos Aires
French male screenwriters
Argentine people of French descent
20th-century French screenwriters
French military personnel of World War I
20th-century French male writers
Argentine emigrants to France
French expatriates in the United States